This article contains information about the literary events and publications of 1675.

Events
November 11 – Gottfried Leibniz's notebooks record a breakthrough in his work on calculus.

New books

Prose
Joshua Barnes – Gerania; a New Discovery of a Little Sort of People, anciently discoursed of, called Pygmies
John Barret – Fifty Queries Seriously Propounded to those that Question or Deny Infants Right to Baptism
Friderich Martens – Spitzbergische oder Groenlandische Reise-Beschreibung, gethan im Jahre 1671
Edward Phillips – Theatrum poetarum
A Satire Against Separatists, variously attributed to Abraham Cowley or Peter Hausted
Philipp Jakob Spener – Pia Desideria
Marie-Catherine de Villedieu – Les Désordres de l’amour
John Wilkins – Of the Principle and Duties of Natural Religion
Miguel de Molinos
Guía espiritual
Breve tratado de la comunión cotidiana
Denis Vairasse – The History of the Sevarites or Sevarambi

Drama
John Crowne 
Calisto, or the Chaste Nymph (masque)
Country Wit
John Dryden – Aureng-zebe
Thomas Duffet – Psyche Debauch'd
Sir Francis Fane – Love in the Dark
Nathaniel Lee – 
 Nero, Emperor of Rome
 Sophonisba
Thomas Otway – Alcibiades
Henry Nevil Payne – The Siege of Constantinople
Thomas Shadwell – The Libertine
William Wycherley – The Country Wife

Poetry
John Wilmot, 2nd Earl of Rochester – A Satire Against Mankind (published 1679)

Births
February 26 (baptized) – Abel Evans, English clergyman, academic and poet (died 1737)
September 2 – William Somervile, English poet (died 1742)
October 11 – Samuel Clarke, English philosopher and cleric (died 1729)

Deaths
April 8 – Veit Erbermann, German theologian and controversialist (born 1597)
September – Heinrich Müller, German devotional writer (born 1631)
September 12 – Girolamo Graziani, Italian poet (born 1604)
September 23 – Valentin Conrart, co-founder of French Academie (born 1603)
November 11 – Thomas Willis, English physician and natural philosopher (born 1621)
December 6 – John Lightfoot, English scholar and cleric (born 1602)

References

 
Years of the 17th century in literature